Palyas is a genus of moth in the family Geometridae first described by Achille Guenée in 1857.

Species
Palyas aura (Cramer, [1775])
Palyas auriferaria (Hulst, 1887)

References

Baptini